The Missouri Pacific Railway Caboose No. 928 is a historic caboose, located near Market and Vine Streets in Bald Knob, Arkansas, near the former Missouri Pacific Depot. It was built in 1937 by the Magor Car Corporation, and was used by the Missouri Pacific Railroad until it was retired in 1986. It was one of the first generation of steel-framed cupola cabooses built, a form that later became commonplace. It was then given to the city of Searcy, where it was displayed until 2009. It was transferred to the White County Historical Society, and was then moved to Bald Knob.

The caboose was listed on the National Register of Historic Places in 2011.

See also
Missouri Pacific Depot (Bald Knob, Arkansas)
National Register of Historic Places listings in White County, Arkansas

References

Railway vehicles on the National Register of Historic Places in Arkansas
Buildings and structures in Bald Knob, Arkansas
Railcars of the United States
National Register of Historic Places in White County, Arkansas
Transportation in White County, Arkansas
1937 in rail transport
Missouri Pacific Railroad
Cabooses
Fruehauf Trailer Corporation